Gavin Cowley (born 1 March 1953) is a South African cricketer. He played in 69 first-class and 48 List A matches from 1970/71 to 1985/86.

References

External links
 

1953 births
Living people
South African cricketers
Eastern Province cricketers
KwaZulu-Natal cricketers
Cricketers from Port Elizabeth